Willem "Wim" Woudsma (11 August 1957 – 23 May 2019) was a Dutch footballer who played as a defender.

Playing career

Club
Born in Nijverdal, Woudsma started his career at local amateur side Hulzense Boys and later joined the FC Twente youth system. He made his senior debut for Go Ahead Eagles in August 1976 against Feyenoord, and played his entire professional career for the club except for his final season when he featured for N.E.C. He played in 430 official matches for Go Ahead, with only John Oude Wesselink (446) having more games for the club. After retiring he played for amateur side De Zweef in Nijverdal, where he also worked as a coach.

International
He earned 9 caps for the Netherlands national under-21 football team between 1977 and 1981 and played 4 games for the Dutch Olympic side.

Managerial career
Woudsma coached at amateur sides De Zweef, Hulzense Boys and Enter Vooruit and he was a youth coach at Go Ahead Eagles.

Personal life
His father Kas played as a goalkeeper for DES Nijverdal and in 26 matches for the Dutch Saturday League squad. Woudsma died in 2019 after a long illness.

References

1957 births
2019 deaths
People from Hellendoorn
Association football defenders
Dutch footballers
Netherlands under-21 international footballers
Go Ahead Eagles players
NEC Nijmegen players
Eredivisie players
Eerste Divisie players
Footballers from Overijssel